Antonio Pasculli (13 October 1842 – 23 February 1924) was an Italian oboist and composer, known as "the Paganini of the oboe".

Biography 

Pasculli was born in Palermo, Sicily on 13 October 1842. He lived there his whole life but travelled widely in Italy, Germany and Austria, giving oboe concerts. He directed symphonic and wind orchestra concerts, which were popular in Italy at the time. He also transcribed a large number of opera pieces for oboe and piano/harp, including works by Bellini, Donizetti, Verdi, and Rossini. One of his well-known works is Etude Caractéristique for oboe and piano "Le Api" (The Bees) written in 1874 which resembles and precedes Rimsky-Korsakov's "Flight of the Bumblebee".

He died in Palermo on 23 February 1924.

Pasculli's works require extraordinary virtuosity on the instrument. His pieces make constant use of arpeggiations, trills, and scales, and require the oboist to use circular breathing. His output was essentially forgotten early in the twentieth century, and he remained in oblivion until oboists Heinz Holliger and Omar Zoboli began reviving his music. As a result, some of his works are now available in recordings.

Compositions

Chamber works 

 Ricordo di napoli, scherzo brillante, for oboe and piano
 Fantasy on themes from Donizetti's 'Poliuto', for oboe and piano 
 Fantasia on themes from Meyerbeer's 'Les Huguenots', for oboe & piano 
 Ommagio a Bellini on themes from 'Il Pirata' and 'La Sonnambula', for English horn and harp
 Gran Sestetto concertante (after Rossini's Guillaume Tell) (arr. W. Renz)

Orchestral works and concertos 

 Concerto on themes from Donizetti's 'La Favorita', for oboe and piano
 Gran Concerto on themes from Verdi's 'I Vespri Siciliani', for oboe and piano

Various works 

 'Le Api' for oboe and piano

References

External links 

 

1842 births
1924 deaths
Italian classical oboists
Male oboists
Italian composers
Italian male composers
19th-century Italian musicians
19th-century Italian male musicians